The 2017 MIAA Division 1A Boy's Ice Hockey Tournament was the state championship tournament for boy's ice hockey in Massachusetts, held from February 27 to March 19. The tournament involved 10 teams in play to determine the state champion of the Massachusetts Interscholastic Athletic Association (MIAA).

Arlington defeated Central Catholic 3–2 to win the program's 1st MIAA Division 1A title.

Qualifying teams 
The Catholic Conference had 3 teams receive a berth in the tournament, while the Atlantic Coast League, Bay State Conference, Catholic Central League, Catholic West Hockey Conference, Merrimack Valley Conference, and Middlesex League had one team receive a berth. An independent program, Hingham, also received a berth.

Bracket 

Note: * denotes overtime; ** denotes double overtime; *** denotes double overtime and shootout

Results

Play-in Round

Quarterfinals

Malden Catholic vs. Marshfield

Arlington vs. Hingham

Pope Francis vs. Central Catholic

Boston College High vs. Walpole

Semifinals

Finals

Record by conference

References 

MIAA Division 1A Boy's Ice Hockey Tournament
MIAA Division 1A Boy's Ice Hockey Tournament
MIAA Division 1A Boy's Ice Hockey Tournament
MIAA Division 1A Boy's Ice Hockey Tournament
Ice hockey competitions in Massachusetts
Massachusetts Interscholastic Athletic Association
Ice hockey competitions in Boston
Sports competitions in Lowell, Massachusetts
Billerica, Massachusetts